Business golf is the use of golf in business.  Typically,  the sport is used as a forum for networking and promotional activity.

References 

Golf